Penn State Dickinson Law, formerly Dickinson School of Law, is a public law school in Carlisle, Pennsylvania.  It is one of two separately accredited law schools of The Pennsylvania State University. According to Penn State Dickinson Law's 2019 ABA-required disclosures, 95% of the Class of 2019 are employed nine months after graduation in positions that either require them to pass the bar or for which a J.D. degree is an advantage.

History

The Law School offers J.D. and LL.M. degrees in law and hosts visiting scholars. The Law School was opened by Judge John Reed in 1834 as the law department of Dickinson College, named for Founding Father John Dickinson.  It received an independent charter in 1890 and ended all affiliation with the college in 1917.

In 2000, Penn State and The Dickinson School of Law completed a merger that began in 1997. From 2006 until 2014, Penn State’s Dickinson School of Law operated as a single law school with two campuses – one in Carlisle, Pennsylvania and one in University Park, Pennsylvania. In the summer of 2014, Penn State received approval from the ABA to operate the two campuses as two distinct law schools (now known as Penn State Law and Dickinson Law), both of which share the history and achievement of The Dickinson School of Law. In November 2022, Penn State President Neeli Bendapudi announced a task force to implement the recommendation that the two schools be merged into a single entity, with the preferred location to be at the Dickinson campus.

Lewis Katz Hall

Lewis Katz Hall is named in honor of philanthropist and businessman Lewis Katz for his $15 million gift to the Law School as the principal donor to the construction and renovation project that began in January 2008. Completed in January 2010, the transition marked the end of a two-year, $52 million construction project which included the addition of the elegant, new Lewis Katz Hall which leverages advanced high-definition, digital audiovisual telecommunications systems to connect Dickinson Law to not only Penn State's University Park campus but to locations around the world.

The project included an extensive renovation of historic Trickett Hall, the Law School's home since 1918, which houses the Law School's library, named in honor of H. Laddie Montague, Jr., a prominent Philadelphia lawyer and trial attorney who has committed $4 million to the school. As a design companion to Penn State Law's Lewis Katz Building, Dickinson Law's Lewis Katz Hall was renovated and rebuilt to comply with LEED Silver standards. The facilities feature state-of-the-art classrooms, a courtroom/auditorium, an exterior courtyard, and an environmentally friendly vegetated green roof.

Curriculum
Dickinson Law's required 1L curriculum begins with the fundamentals of national and transnational law. During their first year, 1Ls must complete courses in Civil Procedure, Constitutional Law, Contracts, Criminal Law, Property, Legal Argument and Factual Persuasion, and Torts. First-year students also take Practicing Law in a Global World: Context and Competencies I, Problem Solving I: The Lawyer and Client, and Problem Solving II: The Lawyer as Writer. Students are required to participate in hands-on training beginning in the first year of the program with simulated client-intake interviews under the supervision of a licensed attorney and culminating in 12 credits of experiential learning upon graduation. This is in addition to required courses that include two semesters of research and writing.

At Dickinson Law, students must earn at least six of 12 required experiential learning credits in a real-world practice setting, such as a certified legal internship within one of the Law School’s in-house legal clinics; an internship with a government, nonprofit or private office; or full immersion in the Semester-in-Practice program; or an international venue. The second and third years at Dickinson Law are distinguished by “The Lawyer As...”: electives and experiential learning opportunities organized by the way lawyers use their training. Required courses after completion of the first year include Problem Solving III: The Lawyer as Persuader and Practicing Law in a Global World: Context and Competencies II.

Students may earn up to six credits towards the J.D. degree from approved graduate-level courses offered by other Penn State departments. Students also may enroll in one of an array of joint degree programs, graduating with both a J.D. from Dickinson Law and a master’s degree from a coordinate department of Penn State. Current joint degree offerings include a J.D./M.B.A., J.D./M.P.A., J.D./M.P.H., J.D./DRPH. Dickinson Law also offers certificate programs in which students may hone their expertise in a specific area by taking a prescribed combination of core and elective courses. Current certificate offerings include Corporate Compliance Certificate, Cyber, Privacy, and Data Security Certificate, Government Affairs, Health Law and Policy, and Litigation and Dispute Resolution.

Dickinson Law Programs

 Semester-in-Washington, D.C. Program (federal government)
 Semester-in-Harrisburg Program (state government)
 Semester-in-San Francisco/Silicon Valley Program (cyber, technology and intellectual property law)
 Semester-in-Los Angeles (sports and entertainment law)
 Semester-in-Texas (energy law)
 Semester-in-New York City (securities regulation and compliance, or entertainment law)
 International Justice Program at the Hague, Netherlands (international criminal law)
 Center for Public Interest Advocacy
 Children's Advocacy Clinic
 Community Law Clinic
 Medical-Legal Partnership Clinic with Penn State Milton S. Hershey Medical Center

Law journals
Dickinson Law features three scholarly journals, including the Dickinson Law Review.  The Law Review was founded in 1897, and is one of the oldest continually published law school journals in the country. In addition, the school also publishes the Penn State Journal of Law and International Affairs, and The Yearbook on Arbitration and Mediation.

Student organizations
Penn State Dickinson Law has the following student organizations:

American Constitution Society
Animal Legal Defense Fund
Asian Pacific American Law Students Association
Black Law Students Association (BLSA)
Business Law Society
Christian Law Community of Dickinson Law
Criminal Law Society (CLS)
Dickinson Law Intellectual Property Law Society
Federalist Society (Fed Soc)
Health Law and Policy Society
International Law Society
Latinx Law Students Association (LLSA)
Middle Eastern Law Students Association (MELSA)
Military Law Caucus (MLC)
Moot Court Board
OutLaw
Phi Alpha Delta — Burr Chapter (PAD)
Public Interest Law Fund (PILF)
Speakers Trust Fund
Sports and Entertainment Law Society
Student Bar Association (SBA)
Women’s Law Caucus (WLC)

Dickinson Law students also participate in a number of moot court competitions and are active in intramural sports leagues, including flag football, basketball, and volleyball. Dickinson Law also sponsors a softball team that competes in a national tournament each spring along with nearly 1,500 law students from across the country. Also, students have coached soccer, lacrosse, track, swimming, and field hockey teams at the nearby Dickinson College and other local youth leagues.

Employment
According to Penn State Dickinson Law's official 2019 ABA-required disclosures, 95% of the class of 2019 obtained full-time, long-term, J.D.-required employment nine months after graduation.

Costs
The total cost of attendance (including tuition and related expenses) at Dickinson Law to earn a J.D. or LL.M. degree during the 2020-2021 academic year is $67,656.

Notable alumni

Matthew W. Brann, Judge of the United States District Court for the Middle District of Pennsylvania
Bill Bufalino, Attorney to Jimmy Hoffa
Christopher F. Burne, U.S. Air Force Lieutenant General, The Judge Advocate General (TJAG)
William W. Caldwell, Judge on the U.S. District Court for the Middle District of Pennsylvania
Mitchell Harry Cohen, Judge of the United States District Court for the District of New Jersey
Christopher Conner, Judge on the U.S. District Court for the Middle District of Pennsylvania
Pedro Cortés, Secretary of the Commonwealth of Pennsylvania
Andrew Curtin, Civil War Governor of Pennsylvania (1861–1867)
J. Steward Davis, Baltimore trial lawyer and first Afro-American valedictorian at Dickinson
J. Michael Eakin, Justice of the Pennsylvania Supreme Court
John Sydney Fine, former Pennsylvania Governor (1951–1955)
Mike Fitzpatrick, United States Congressman from Pennsylvania
Robert S. Gawthrop III, Judge of the United States District Court for the Eastern District of Pennsylvania
Jim Gerlach, United States Congressman from Pennsylvania
Kim Gibson, Judge on the United States District Court for the Western District of Pennsylvania
Milton W. Glenn (1903–1967), represented New Jersey's 2nd congressional district from 1957–1965
Thomas M. Golden, Judge of the United States District Court for the Eastern District of Pennsylvania
Rick Gray, former mayor of Lancaster, Pennsylvania (2006–2018)
T. Millet Hand (1902–1956), represented New Jersey's 2nd congressional district in the United States House of Representatives from 1945–1957
John Berne Hannum, Judge of the United States District Court for the Eastern District of Pennsylvania
Daniel Brodhead Heiner (1854–1944), U.S. Representative from Pennsylvania
Arthur Horace James, 31st Governor of Pennsylvania (1939–1943)
Charles Alvin Jones, former Judge of the United States Court of Appeals for the Third Circuit and Chief Justice of the Supreme Court of Pennsylvania
John E. Jones III, U.S. District Judge for United States District Court for the Middle District of Pennsylvania, who presided over the ruling in Kitzmiller v. Dover Area School District which states that the teaching of Intelligent design in public classrooms violates the Establishment Clause of the U.S. Constitution, and Whitewood v. Wolf which ruled unconstitutional Pennsylvania's statutory ban on same-sex marriage.
Paul E. Kanjorski, former United States Congressman from Pennsylvania
Lewis Katz, former owner of the New Jersey Nets basketball team
Jack Keeney, career U.S. Department of Justice attorney
John W. Kephart, Justice of the Supreme Court of Pennsylvania (1919-1936), Chief Justice (1936-1940)
Edwin Michael Kosik, Judge of the United States District Court for the Middle District of Pennsylvania
George Kunkel, Pennsylvania State Senator (1937-1941)
Tom Marino, U.S. Congressman from Pennsylvania and former United States Attorney for the Middle District of Pennsylvania
Clarence Charles Newcomer, (1923–2005), Judge of the United States District Court for the Eastern District of Pennsylvania
John Pettit, long-time district attorney of Washington County, Pennsylvania.
Sylvia H. Rambo, first woman to serve as Chief Judge of the United States District Court for the Middle District of Pennsylvania
Tom Ridge, former Pennsylvania Governor (1995–2001), former Assistant to the President for Homeland Security (2001–2003), first United States Secretary of Homeland Security (2003–2005)
Carl Risch, Assistant Secretary of State for Consular Affairs
Andrew Sacks, Pennsylvania trial lawyer, one of the few U.S. attorneys who has handled two cases in excess of $1 billion
Rick Santorum, former U.S. Senator from Pennsylvania (1995–2007)
Lansdale Sasscer, 1914, U.S. Congressman for Maryland's 5th District
Ronald A. Sell, Wisconsin State Assemblyman
Michael Henry Sheridan, Judge of the United States District Court for the Middle District of Pennsylvania
D. Brooks Smith, class of 1976, Judge on the U.S. Court of Appeals for the Third Circuit
Edward G. Smith, Judge of the United States District Court for the Eastern District of Pennsylvania
Donald Snyder (LLM, Commerce and Taxation), Member of the Pennsylvania House of Representatives 1981-2000 and Majority Whip
Gerald J. Spitz, Pennsylvania State of Representatives for the 162nd district (1977-1984)
Correale Stevens, Justice of the Supreme Court of Pennsylvania
Richard Barclay Surrick, Judge of the United States District Court for the Eastern District of Pennsylvania
Emanuel Mac Troutman, Judge of the United States District Court for the Eastern District of Pennsylvania
Thomas I. Vanaskie, class of 1978, former chief judge of the United States District Court for the Middle District of Pennsylvania and current judge on the Third Circuit Court of Appeals

References

External links
 Official website
  Official logo

 
Pennsylvania State University colleges
Law schools in Pennsylvania
Universities and colleges in Cumberland County, Pennsylvania
Carlisle, Pennsylvania
Educational institutions established in 1834
1834 establishments in Pennsylvania
Dickinson Law